Thanne Vandi is a 2021 Indian Tamil-language drama film written and directed by debutant Manika Vidya and produced by Sri Saravana Film Arts. The film stars Umapathy Ramaiah and Samskruthy Shenoy in the lead roles with a supporting cast including Bala Saravanan, Vinutha Lal, Thambi Ramaiah, Devadarshini and Vidyullekha Raman. The film was released in theatres on 31 December 2021.

Cast 
 Umapathy Ramaiah
 Samskruthy Shenoy as Thamini 
 Bala Saravanan
 Vinutha Lal as Prema Shankaran
 Thambi Ramaiah
 Devadarshini
 Vidyullekha Raman
 Aadukalam Naren
 Kadhal Sukumar
 Mullai 
 Kothandam

Soundtrack 
The soundtrack and score is composed by Moses and the album featured four songs. The audio rights were acquired by Trend Music.

Release and reception
The film was released in theatres on 31 December 2021. Navein Darshan of Cinema Express wrote, "Thanne Vandi was promised to be a tale of a man with drinking issues and also happens to own a water truck (hence the title). But the film ends up delivering a feel similar to a never-ending drunk talk of a distressing acquaintance, who assumes to be the star of the evening".

References